is a former Japanese football player. She played for Japan national team.

Club career
Kawakami was born in Akashi on November 16, 1977. In 1990, she was 13 years old, she joined for Tasaki-Shinju Kobe (later Tasaki Perule FC). She previously played midfielder. However, when she entered Japan national team, she became a right back. After success at this position, she remained a defender when she transferred to Nippon TV Beleza. She had a lot of success with her two clubs, winning one L.League title with her first club in 2003 and three Empress's Cups, and two other titles with her second one. She was also selected Best Eleven 5 times (2000, 2002, 2003, 2004 and 2005).

National team career
On March 16, 2001, Kawakami debuted for Japan national team against Chinese Taipei. She played at 2001, 2003 AFC Championship and 2002 Asian Games. She was also a member of Japan for 2003 World Cup and the 2004 Olympic Games. She played 48 games for Japan until 2005.

After retirement
After retiring from international football in 2005 and from football the following year, Kawakami became a commentator  for NBS at the 2007 World Cup qualification round. She then commented the final tournament for Fuji TV. In 2011, she was commentator for NHK during the Women's World Cup tournament, including when the Japan national team won the world title.

National team statistics

Achievements

Individual
5 times in the best eleven: 2000, 2002, 2003, 2004, 2005

Club
Tasaki Perule FC
 1 L.League championship title: 2003 (runners-up in 2001 and 2002)
 3 Empress's Cup: 2000, 2003, 2004

Nippon TV Bereza
 2 L.League championship title : 2005,2006
 1 Empress's Cup: 2006

References

External links

1977 births
Living people
Association football people from Hyōgo Prefecture
Japanese women's footballers
Japan women's international footballers
Nadeshiko League players
Tasaki Perule FC players
Nippon TV Tokyo Verdy Beleza players
2003 FIFA Women's World Cup players
Olympic footballers of Japan
Footballers at the 2004 Summer Olympics
Asian Games medalists in football
Footballers at the 2002 Asian Games
Asian Games bronze medalists for Japan
Women's association football midfielders
Medalists at the 2002 Asian Games